Bawal Na Game Show is a Philippine game show broadcast on TV5, presented by comedians Paolo Ballesteros and Wally Bayola. The program premiered on the network's Todo Max Panalo block on August 15, 2020, and internationally via Kapatid TV5 on November 7, 2020 on a delayed basis. The show originally aired Tuesdays and Thursdays at 7:30 pm and Saturdays at 7:00 pm alternating with its companion program, Fill in the Bank, both blocktime productions of Archangel Media.

From October 12, 2020 to December 10, 2020, Bawal Na Game Show moved to its new timeslot in primetime at 8 p.m. following Fill in the Bank at 7 p.m., both airing back-to-back episodes on a Monday-Tuesday-Thursday schedule to make way for the influx of new programming at TV5 (and the coverage of the 2020 PBA season) which will take over the primetime timeslot for Wednesdays and Fridays.

From December 14, 2020 to February 17, 2021, the show extends to five nights from Mondays to Fridays.

On February 23, 2021, the show was aired every Tuesdays and Thursdays (which was returned to the original airtime except Saturdays, four months ago) starting on an earlier timeslot at 5:00 PM alternating with its companion program Fill in the Bank which will be aired every Mondays, Wednesdays and Fridays before Frontline Pilipinas.

On March 30, 2021, the program concluded and was replaced by Sing Galing!

Cast

Hosts
 Paolo Ballesteros as Barby Ghorl
 Wally Bayola as Bebe Ghorl
 Echo Calingal as Birit Ghorl

Featuring
 Brion James Lim as Bawal Officer Byron
 Gringo Baring, Jr. as Bawal Officer Gringo
 Mark Benson Pelota as Bawal Officer MacMac
 Richard Jonathan de Claro as Bawal Officer RJ
 Kim Whamos Cruz as Pambansang Poser Whendell Wamos
 Ricky Luzano as himself
 Madam Jinky P. as himself

Format
Four contestants, deemed as "pasaway" compete in challenging parlor games in order to become the "Pasa-wais" of the day and have the chance to win the daily jackpot. The three elimination and lone jackpot rounds consist of the following Bawal, or don't challenges:
 Bawal ang Mag-Emote - Don't emote; four contestants test the flexibility and balance that they stood in the face booth where there were emotion icons behind them. the emotion icons will advance behind them whenever they are caught by hanging.
 Bawal ang Lumusot - Don't infiltrate; three contestants try to jumping some of the boxes selected by the color randomizer at the signal of the hosts.
 Bawal ang Slow - Don't slow; two remaining contestants rolls the number dices to find out how many times they must do this before they can run over the obstacle cones carrying their marker chips. they put the chips on the giant tic-tac-toe floor. they have to go back to the starting point where they will again throw the dice do the task and run over the obstacle cones.
 Bawal ang Sumuko - Don't quit; the remaining contestant, or "pasa-wais" completes the three various challenges as they navigate the plexiglass maze in the jackpot round.

The winning contestant, or "Pasa-wais", receives P50,000, while the "Certified Pasaways" each receive a consolation prize of P5,000.

Former
 Bawal ang Ma-Fall - Don't let it fall; four contestants try to keep each of their objects from falling to the ground while imitating the Pambansang Poser's various body poses and expressions.
 Bawal ang Da-Moves - Don't move; three contestants try to endure sitting still despite the surrounding distractions they are all subjected to involving the five senses.
 Bawal ang Sablay - Don't get the answer wrong; two remaining contestants answer questions in wacky, physical activities.

Episodes

See also
 List of programs broadcast by TV5 (Philippine TV network)
 Kapatid Channel

Notes

References

External links

 

TV5 (Philippine TV network) original programming
Philippine game shows
2020 Philippine television series debuts
2021 Philippine television series endings
2020s game shows
Filipino-language television shows
Television series by Cignal Entertainment